WFGC (channel 61) is a religious television station licensed to Palm Beach, Florida, United States, serving the West Palm Beach area as an owned-and-operated station of the Christian Television Network (CTN). The station's studios are located on West Blue Heron Boulevard in Riviera Beach (in the former studio of Fox affiliate WFLX, channel 29), and its transmitter is located near Royal Palm Beach, Florida.

Technical information

Subchannels
The station's digital signal is multiplexed:

Analog-to-digital conversion
WFGC discontinued regular programming on its analog signal, over UHF channel 61, on June 12, 2009, the official date in which full-power television stations in the United States transitioned from analog to digital broadcasts under federal mandate. The station's digital signal remained on its pre-transition UHF channel 49. Through the use of PSIP, digital television receivers display the station's virtual channel as its former UHF analog channel 61, which was among the high band UHF channels (52-69) that were removed from broadcasting use as a result of the transition.

References

External links
WFGC website
CTN corporate website

Television channels and stations established in 1993
1993 establishments in Florida
FGC
Christian Television Network affiliates